Akhtar (Pashto: اختر) means "star" in Persian and is used in Pashto for Nowruz and Eid Day. It is also a common surname. A variant spelling is Akhter.

Notable people with the given name or surname include:

Given name

Akhtar
 Akhtar Aly Kureshy Pakistani lawyer and professor
 Akhtar ul Iman (1915–1996), Indian Urdu poet and screenwriter
 Akhtar Mengal, Pakistani politician
 Akhtar Hameed Khan, Pakistani development practitioner and social scientist
 Akhtar Khan, British television and radio presenter for the BBC
 Akhtar Chaudhry, Pakistani-Norwegian politician
 Akhtar Hussain Malik, general of the Pakistan Army

Akhter
 Akhter Husain (1902–1983), Pakistani politician

Aktar
 Aktar Islam, British-Bangladeshi restaurateur

Surname

Akhtar
 Ayad Akhtar, American playwright, novelist, and screenwriter
 Farhan Akhtar, Indian film director
 Gulraiz Akhtar, Pakistani field hockey player
 Jan Nisar Akhtar, Indian poet
 Javed Akhtar, film writer and poet from India
 Najma Akhtar, British singer
 Saleem Akhtar, Pakistani former cricketer
 Shamshad Akhtar, Executive Secretary of the United Nations Economic and Social Commission for Asia and the Pacific
 Shoaib Akhtar, Pakistani former cricketer
 Zoya Akhtar, Indian film director

Akhter
 Mahfuza Akhter, Bangladeshi football administrator, member of the FIFA Council
Doli Akhter (born 1986), Olympic swimmer from Bangladesh 
Moin Akhter (1950–2011), Pakistani television actor
Salma Akhter, Bangladeshi singer

Aktar
 Cengiz Aktar, Turkish scientist
 Mohammad Aktar, Afghan wrestler

See also
 Akhtar, a Persian-language periodical founded in Istanbul, 1876

Indian unisex given names
Pakistani unisex given names
Persian unisex given names
Persian-language surnames